Invisible Avenger is a 1958 film noir crime film directed by James Wong Howe, Ben Parker and John Sledge. The film was a compilation of two television pilot episodes of a 1957 Republic Pictures TV show called The Shadow. When the show failed to sell, the episodes (one of which was directed by cinematographer James Wong Howe) were edited together and released as a theatrical feature called Invisible Avenger.

The film was re-released in 1962 under the title Bourbon Street Shadows by the  Louisiana-based MPA films. The episodes were shot on location in New Orleans.

Plot summary 
Pablo Ramirez is an expatriate from the Caribbean nation of Santa Cruz that is under control of a military dictator called the Generalissimo.  From New Orleans, Ramirez plots a revolution and his return to Santa Cruz.  To assist in this and to protect him from the Santa Cruz secret police who are in New Orleans he seeks the help of Lamont Cranston through a mutual friend, jazz trumpeter Tony Alcade.  In the midst of a telephone call to Cranston, Tony is murdered by the secret police.
Cranston and his metaphysical mentor Jogendra come to New Orleans to bring Tony's murderers to justice and freedom to Santa Cruz.

Though no one knows the identity of the crime fighting trouble shooter The Shadow who has telepathic powers, everyone knows that he can be contacted for help through Lamont Cranston.  As Cranston protects Pablo from secret police assassination and kidnapping attempts, the Generalissimo broadcasts the execution of Pablo's twin brother that is shown on television in the United States in a scheme to draw Pablo into the open.

Cast 
 Richard Derr as Lamont Cranston/The Shadow
 Mark Daniels as Jogendra
 Helen Westcott as Tara O'Neill
 Jack Donner as Billy Sanchez
 Jeanne Neher as Felicia Ramirez
 Steve Dano as Tony Alcalde
 Dan Mullin as Pablo Ramirez / Victor Ramirez
 Leo Bruno as Ramon "Rocco" Martinez
 Lee Edwards as The Colonel
 Sam Page as Charlie, airport thug

Notes

External links 
 

1958 films
1958 crime drama films
1950s action films
American black-and-white films
Republic Pictures films
Films set in New Orleans
Films shot in New Orleans
The Shadow films
American crime drama films
1950s English-language films
1950s American films